Rachel Cronin (born September 29, 1971) is a Canadian actress, best known for her role as Shirley Pifko on the NBC television series Ed.

Cronin's father was Edmond Jude Cronin, a provincial court judge. She was born in Alberta and grew up in Vancouver, British Columbia. She attended Argyle Secondary School, a high school which emphasised the arts, where she won awards and bursaries for her acting. She was then accepted to the University of British Columbia Bachelor of Fine Arts Acting Program and graduated top of her class. Cronin has since been working in theatre, television and film, and in 2000 she was signed on to play the eccentric Shirley Pifko on Ed.

Film and television filmography
Eye Level (1995)
Cat Swallows Parakeet and Speaks! (1996)
Poltergeist: The Legacy (1997)
The Outer Limits (1998)
Y2K (1998)
They Nest (2000)
Ed (2000–2004)
Spook (2003)
This Space for Rent (2006)
Reaper (2009)

References

External links

1971 births
Actresses from Vancouver
Canadian television actresses
Living people
University of British Columbia alumni